Walter Matoni (27 June 1917 – 26 June 1988) was a Luftwaffe ace and recipient of the Knight's Cross of the Iron Cross during World War II. The Knight's Cross of the Iron Cross was the highest award in the military and paramilitary forces of Nazi Germany during World War II.

Career
Matoni was born on 27 June 1917 in Duisburg. Feldwebel Matoni was assigned to 9./Jagdgeschwader 27 (JG 27—27th Fighter Wing) in the summer of 1940 and his first claim, a Hawker Hurricane followed on 30 September. During mid 1941 Matoni operated over Russia and claimed three victories (Two DB-3's and an R-10). On 17 August 1941, Feldwebel Matoni was posted to II. Gruppe of Jagdgeschwader 26 "Schlageter" (JG 26—26th Fighter Wing). On 21 September, he was transferred to III. Gruppe of Jagdgeschwader 2 "Richthofen" (JG 2—2nd Fighter Wing) based at the airfield near Saint-Pol-sur-Ternoise.

He was badly wounded in aerial combat resulting in a lengthy convalescence, following which he served as an instructor with Jagdgruppe West from October 1942 to February 1943. On 28 February, Matoni was posted to 6. Staffel of JG 26.

He shot down a Supermarine Spitfire on 17 June as his fifth victory. On 31 August, Oberleutnant Matoni's Focke Wulf Fw 190 A-6 (Werknummner 530118—factory number) was hit and he was wounded by return fire from United States Army Air Forces (USAAF) Boeing B-17 Flying Fortress bombers resulting in a forced landing at Montdidier. In December he claimed a Spitfire near Boulogne on 21 December as his 8th victory.

In an action against USAAF B-26 twin-engine bombers on 14 January 1944 Matoni shot down a Spitfire escorting the bombers, probably flown by Austrian-born S/L. Franz Colloredo-Mansfeld DFC (3 destroyed) of No. 132 Squadron RAF, who was killed. On 24 February Matoni shot down a USAAF B-24 four-engine bomber near Frankfurt for his 13th and JG 26's 2,000th victory.

Matoni was appointed Staffelkapitän (squadron leader) 5. Staffel of JG 26 on 25 February 1944. He succeeded Oberfeldwebel Adolf Glunz who was transferred.
On 10 May, he was awarded the German Cross in Gold for 20 victories.

Group commander
On 15 August 1944, Hauptmann Matoni was appointed Gruppenkommandeur (group commander) of I. Gruppe of Jagdgeschwader 11 (JG 11—11th Fighter Wing). He took command of the Gruppe on 17 August. The Gruppe had just relocated to an airfield at Dammartin-en-Goële and had been augmented by a fourth Saffel following a period of rest an replenishment in Germany.

In September, he was transferred and appointed Gruppenkommandeur of I. Gruppe of JG 2, replacing Hauptmann Erich Hohagen who had been injured in combat.

On 5 December, Matoni was so seriously injured in a crash he was unfit to undertake any further combat flying. Despite this, he was appointed Gruppenkommandeur of II./JG 2 in January 1945 until 28 February. Matoni was awarded the Knight's Cross of the Iron Cross on 16 December 1944.

He ended the war at the Fighter Pilot's rest-home at Bad Wiessee. Matoni died on 26 June 1988 in Frankfurt.

Just three years before his death, Matoni appeared on the British television show This Is Your Life on the 8 May 1985, the 40th anniversary of the German capitulation. He was guest on the Johnnie Johnson episode, celebrating the RAF ace' life. Matoni's presence owed to a British media-created legend that Johnson personally challenged the German to a duel over Normandy.

Summary of career

Aerial victory claims
According to Obermaier, Matoni was credited with 34 aerial victories claimed in over 400 claimed missions. He claimed three aerial victories on the Eastern Front, and further 31 aerial victories on the Western Front, including 14 were four-engined heavy bombers. Mathews and Foreman, authors of Luftwaffe Aces — Biographies and Victory Claims, researched the German Federal Archives and found records for 29 aerial victory claims, plus one further unconfirmed claim. This figure includes three aerial victories on the Eastern Front and 26 over the Western Allies, including 10 four-engined bombers.

Victory claims were logged to a map-reference (PQ = Planquadrat), for example "PQ 04 Ost N/AD-8/9". These sectors were then subdivided into 36 smaller units to give a location area 3 × 4 km in size.

Awards
 Flugzeugführerabzeichen
 Front Flying Clasp of the Luftwaffe
 Wound Badge (1939) in Black and Silver
 Iron Cross (1939) 2nd and 1st Class
 Honor Goblet of the Luftwaffe on 8 May 1944 as Oberleutnant and pilot
 German Cross in Gold on 1 October 1944 as Oberleutnant in the 5./Jagdgeschwader 26
 Knight's Cross of the Iron Cross on 16 December 1944 as Hauptmann and Gruppenkommandeur of the II./Jagdgeschwader 2 "Richthofen"

Notes

References

Citations

Bibliography

External links
Aces of the Luftwaffe
TracesOfWar.com

1917 births
1988 deaths
People from the Rhine Province
German World War II flying aces
Recipients of the Gold German Cross
Recipients of the Knight's Cross of the Iron Cross
Military personnel from Duisburg